Highpoint is an unincorporated community in eastern Pinellas County, Florida, United States, near Tampa Bay. It is situated between Feather Sound and Largo. The area includes the census-designated place of South Highpoint.

Geography
Highpoint is located at 27.91667 degrees north, 82.71306  degrees west (27.91667, -82.71306). The elevation for the community is 13 feet above sea level.

Education
The community of Highpoint is served by Pinellas County Schools.

References

Unincorporated communities in Pinellas County, Florida
Unincorporated communities in Florida
Populated places on Tampa Bay
Former census-designated places in Pinellas County, Florida
Former census-designated places in Florida